Aguinalíu or Aguinaliu is a locality located in the municipality of Graus, in Huesca province, Aragon, Spain. As of 2020, it has a population of 19.

Geography 
Aguinalíu is located 86km east of Huesca.

References

Populated places in the Province of Huesca